Miss Jordan was a national Beauty pageant in Jordan.

History
Miss Jordan was founded in 1959 and organized by Jihad Magazine under the directorship of John Halabi. It was an annual event held with the patronage of the Ministry of Tourism and Antiquities under Minister Ghaleb Barakat. Miss Jordan featured contestants from both Transjordan and West Bank which was at that time under Jordanian administration. Usually, two titles were awarded at the pageant - "Miss Jordan" and the runner-up "Queen of Elegance". From 1959 to 1964, the pageant took place at the Hotel Philadelphia in Amman and was later moved in 1965 to Hotel Panorama in the city of Beit Jala in West Bank.  Ufemia Rizk née Jabaji became the first Miss Jordan 1959. The pageant became the national franchisee of Miss World in 1959 and sent the first ever international representative from Jordan to Miss World the same year.

Over the course of its eight-year existence, the winners and runners-up of Miss Jordan competed at Miss World and other international pageants such as Miss International and Miss Universe. The pageant was held for the last time in 1966. The Arab-Israel war of 1967 led to the cancellation of the event indefinitely and the pageant has not been organized ever since. Subsequently, Jordan withdrew from Miss World and all other major international pageants. Vera Jalil Khamis from Jerusalem was the last Miss Jordan and representative of the country to Miss World 1966

Jordan at International pageants

Miss Universe Jordan

Miss World Jordan

Miss International Jordan

Miss Intercontinental Jordan

References

 

Recurring events established in 1959
Jordan